Polkanovo is a rural locality (a selo) in Kyakhtinsky District, Republic of Buryatia, Russia. The population was 146 as of 2010. There are 3 streets. There are alternative names called Polkanovo and Polkanovskiy. Populated place where people live and work. The region of Polkanovo is Respublika Buryatiya, Russia. Koppen climate type is Dwc : Monsoon-influences subarctic climate. The timezone is UTC+8.

Geography 
Polkanovo is located 62 km southeast of Kyakhta (the district's administrative centre) by road. Ungurkuy is the nearest rural locality.

References 

Rural localities in Kyakhtinsky District